Markham House may refer to:

United States 
(by state)
Markham House (Atlanta, Georgia), an 1875 former hotel
Markham House (Dublin, New Hampshire), NRHP-listed
Markham Cobblestone Farmhouse and Barn Complex, Lima, New York, NRHP-listed
Markham-Albertson-Stinson Cottage, Nags Head, North Carolina, NRHP-listed
Markham School and Teacherage, Oilton, Oklahoma, listed on the NRHP in Creek County, Oklahoma
Markham Farmstead, Conde, South Dakota, listed on the NRHP in Spink County, South Dakota